Vulcan Airport  is located immediately west of Vulcan, Alberta, Canada.

The airport served until 2015 as the base for the Southern Alberta Gliding Center, a part of the Air Cadet Gliding Program. The centre has moved to the former site of RCAF Station Vulcan.

The airport is accessed from the east side. Its southeast corner is shared with a water treatment facility.

References

External links
Place to Fly on COPA's Places to Fly airport directory

Registered aerodromes in Alberta
Vulcan County